Leon Emil Dessez (April 12, 1858 – December 25, 1918) was an American architect in Washington D.C. He designed public buildings in Washington D.C. and residences in Washington D.C., Maryland, and Virginia, including some of the first in Chevy Chase, Maryland, where he was the community's first resident. His work includes the 1893 the conversion of 1111 Pennsylvania Avenue, The Shepherd Centennial Building, into the Raleigh Hotel (razed in 1911)
 and the Normal School for Colored Girls (1913), designed with Snowden Ashford.

Early life 
Dessez was born in Washington, D.C. on April 12, 1858. Bessie Semmes Dessez, mother of Captain J.H.S. Dessez and Elizabeth S. Dessez.

Career 
Dessez began his career employed under Colonel Thomas Lincoln Casey on plans for the Washington Monument and spent three years as an architectural and engineering draftsman in the Navy Yard at Washington. He and Lindley Johnson of Philadelphia designed the first four houses in Chevy Chase, Maryland and Dessez became its first resident.

Dessez was elected to the American Institute of Architects as fellow 1896. He was one of the Washington D.C. AIA chapter's charter members in 1887 and he served on a committee for the restoration of the Octagon House, now the AIA headquarters. He also worked pro bono to develop Washington D.C.'s building codes and investigated school building construction and design. He died in Washington D.C. December 25, 1918.

Properties he is credited with designing listed on the National Register of Historic Places include Lucinda Cady House, 7064 Eastern Ave., NW. Washington, DC; Engine House No. 10, 1341 Maryland Ave., NE. Washington, DC; Miner Normal School, 2565 Georgia Ave., NW. Washington, DC; and Truck Company F, 1336-1338 Park Rd. NW Washington, DC.

Other works

G.E. Hamilton Residence
628 E. Capitol St. NE (1885) 
Official residence for the vice president at the Naval Observatory, known as the Admiral's House (1893) on Observatory Circle, at Massachusetts Ave. at 34th St. NW. A Late Victorian red brick building (since painted over) the porched home was built with a turret and dormers.
926 F Street Northwest, a three-story brick building for law firm Wold and Cohen.
 Gallinger Hospital which became District of Columbia General Hospital
Workhouse at Occoquan, now the Lorton Reformatory, 1909 The planning "revolutionized the architecture of penal institutions" with its open air design.
The Stoddert (1899), 2900 Q Street NW; Apartment building in Georgetown
House ("residence") for E.J. Stellwagen (1899 plans), Baltimore (i.e., Biltmore) Street and Columbia Road (lot 2, block 2), N.W., Cliffbourne, Washington, D.C.
 Corby Mansion (C. 1893) 9 Chevy Chase Circle, was Senator Francis G. Newlands house from 1893 to 1898, remodeled in 1911  
St. James Episcopal Church 1891–1897 14 Cornwall St, Leesburg, Virginia, later additions were added (1931?)
 Kappa House (1908) 1708 S Street, NW. Originally a residence, it became the Washington DC Alumni chapter of Kappa Alpha Psi fraternity since June 4, 1949. Georgian architecture style
Garfield Memorial Hospital, replaced by Washington Hospital Center
Soldiers' Home, Washington, D.C., now the Armed Forces Retirement Home
 D.S. Porter House (plans) 1894 9 East Lenox Street, Chevy Chase. Craftsman and Colonial Revival architectural styles
Powell Junior High School (1910) demolished
Fairmont Field Club (1912) Destroyed by fire 2008

References

1858 births
1918 deaths
19th-century American architects
Architects from Washington, D.C.
People from Chevy Chase, Maryland